Sophia of Schleswig-Holstein-Gottorp (1 June 1569 at Gottorf Castle – 14 November 1634 in Schwerin) was regent of the Duchy of Mecklenburg-Schwerin from 1603 to 1608.

Life 
Sophia was the eldest daughter of Duke Adolph of Holstein-Gottorp and his wife Christine of Hesse.  She married on 17 February 1588 in Reinbek to Duke John VII of Mecklenburg.  John was a weak ruler who was unable to rule his indebted and corrupt country.  Sophia almost lived in poverty.

In 1592, her husband stabbed himself with seven stab wounds.  Initially, Duke Ulrich of Mecklenburg took up the regency and Sophia retreated to her widow's seat in Lübz.  The country visibly declined during the administration of governors sent by Duke Ulrich.

Sophia administered her wittum, the districts of Rehna and Wittenburg very cautiously, economically and carefully.  After Duke Ulrich died in 1603, Duke Charles I asked Sophia to administer Mecklenburg-Schwerin on behalf of her underage sons.  She took up the challenge and acted energetically against the abuses of the previous administration.  She managed to improve the Duchy's financial situation.

In 1608, Duke Charles I asked the emperor to declare Sophia's eldest son an adult.  Her sons had been estranged from her for some time.  During their reign, the country descended into financial chaos again.  Sophia returned to Lübz.  In 1628, Wallenstein conquered Mecklenburg and forced her sons to leave the country.  However, he left her in peace.

Sophia died on 14 November 1634.  The later Grand Dukes of Mecklenburg-Schwerin and Mecklenburg-Strelitz all descend from her.

Issue 
 Adolf Frederick I, Duke of Mecklenburg-Schwerin from 1592 to 1628 and from 1631 to 1658
 John Albert II, Duke of Mecklenburg-Güstrow from 1592 to 1628 and from 1631 to 1636
 Anna Sophie (1591-1648)

Ancestors

References 
 

Regents of Germany
House of Holstein-Gottorp
Duchesses of Mecklenburg
1569 births
1634 deaths
16th-century German people
17th-century German people
17th-century women rulers
Daughters of monarchs